Janet Jackson  (stylized as JANET JACKSON.) is a limited-run documentary television series produced by American singer and actress Janet Jackson and her brother Randy Jackson, directed by Benjamin Hirsch. The series was developed over a period of three years by Rick Murray at Workerbee Documentary Films who executive produced. The documentary series premiered 28 January 2022, with the first two episodes of the four-part series airing on Lifetime and A&E simultaneously in the United States. The next two episodes aired the following night, 29 January. On 29 January 2022, Jackson previewed a clip of a new song, "Luv I Luv", during the end credits of the last episode. The documentary premiered in the United Kingdom on Sky Documentaries and streaming service NOW on 31 January 2022.

Conception and development
In 2017, Jackson contacted English production company, Workerbee, to film footage of her on tour. Filming commenced that same year while Jackson was in the midst of her State of the World Tour. Producer Rick Murray explained, "We met Janet over five years ago. She lives in the UK a lot these days — she has family here — and through a joint person we both knew we were asked to go and cover some behind the scenes footage of one of her tours. I sent my best director, Ben [Hirsch], and I sort of said in his ear before he went … 'There's something bigger that we can do with Janet.' And we both love making movies, making feature documentaries, and we just thought there is a feature documentary here of her life that has not been told."

Jackson sent Murray and Hirsch 7,000 tapes from her personal archive. "She recorded everything, from the rehearsals at the Super Bowl that no one had seen before, through to the recording of [the music video] 'Scream,' in the studio recording Rhythm Nation, and no one had seen these tapes before. … It took us weeks and months to go through them." The series was filmed over a period of five years.

Episodes

Reception
The series averaged 3.1 million total viewers for its premiere on Lifetime and A&E, marking the highest non-fiction debut in viewership and ratings on cable since ESPN's Michael Jordan docuseries The Last Dance. The networks reported it also drew in 3.7 million video views across Lifetime and A&E's on-demand platforms, with linear and video views on digital combining to reach 15.7 million total viewers.

Above the typical averages for both networks, the documentary drew a 0.66 rating among adults 18–49 across its two hours, beating everything on Nielsen-measured TV in primetime. Janet Jackson also led cable among adults 18–34 and 25–54.

Critical response
On Rotten Tomatoes, the series holds an approval rating of 71% based on 24 reviews, with an average rating of 6.6/10. The website's critical consensus states: "Janet Jackson. feels too carefully curated by its own subject to yield any real insight, but it suffices as a nostalgic tribute to the pop icon."

References

External links
 Janet Jackson on Lifetime
 Janet Jackson on A&E
 

2020s American documentary television series
2020s British documentary television series
2022 American television series debuts
2022 American television series endings
A&E (TV network) original programming
Documentary television series about music
English-language television shows
Janet Jackson
Lifetime (TV network) original programming